Heritage Media Corporation (NYSE: HTG) was a media company which owned television and radio stations across the United States, as well as in-store and direct marketing companies. It was based in Dallas, Texas, from 1987 to 1997.

History
Heritage Media was founded in August 1987 by a group of Heritage Communications executives to acquire the company's television and radio stations. The sale coincided with Heritage Communications' merger with Tele-Communications Inc.; at the time, Federal Communications Commission (FCC) regulations did not allow a company to own both a television station and a cable system in a market. Heritage Communications had acquired the stations through the 1985 purchase of Dakota Broadcasting and the 1986 acquisitions of Rollins Communications and six LIN Broadcasting radio stations. Heritage Media's president and chief executive officer, James M. Hoak Jr., held the same positions with Heritage Communications; the company's headquarters were located in Des Moines, Iowa (where Heritage Communications was based), until later in 1987, when it relocated to Dallas, Texas.

Heritage Media managed its television stations with more of an emphasis on cash flow than ratings, and focused its radio group on stations that it felt needed a turnaround (for instance, it had acquired KKSN AM-FM in Portland, Oregon, out of bankruptcy). To implement this strategy, the company's stations operated with large sales staffs but were otherwise staffed sparingly. Heritage Media went public in September 1988, trading on the American Stock Exchange. By then, it had invested in POP Radio, an in-store radio company, and Du-Kross Media, which sold advertisements on shopping carts. In 1989, Heritage Media purchased Actmedia, a in-store marketing company. In 1996, the company merged with DIMAC Corporation, a direct marketing services company. On July 15, 1996, Heritage Media moved its stock listing to the New York Stock Exchange.

News Corporation announced on March 17, 1997, that it would acquire Heritage Media for $754 million. The purchase was mainly for the Actmedia and DIMAC subsidiaries, and News Corporation immediately announced its intention to sell Heritage Media's broadcast properties; News Corporation's Fox Television Stations subsidiary was already at Federal Communications Commission (FCC) ownership limits, and the company had no interest in operating radio stations. On July 16, 1997, Sinclair Broadcast Group announced that it would acquire the Heritage Media stations for $630 million. The sale to News Corporation was completed on August 20, 1997; Heritage Media's stations were then transferred to a trustee, with Sinclair assuming control of the stations in stages from January 29, 1998, to July 1998. Actmedia was folded into News Corporation's News America Marketing subsidiary.

Former stations 
Stations are arranged alphabetically by state and by city of license.

Television

Radio

Notes

References 

Defunct companies based in Texas
Defunct broadcasting companies of the United States
Defunct mass media companies of the United States
Former News Corporation subsidiaries
Companies based in Dallas
Entertainment companies established in 1987
Mass media companies established in 1987
Mass media companies disestablished in 1997
Companies disestablished in 1997
Companies formerly listed on NYSE American
Companies formerly listed on the New York Stock Exchange
Sinclair Broadcast Group
1987 establishments in Texas
1997 disestablishments in Texas